The First Yamagata Cabinet is the third Cabinet of Japan led by Yamagata Aritomo from December 24, 1889 to May 6, 1891.

Cabinet

References 

Cabinet of Japan
1889 establishments in Japan
Cabinets established in 1889
Cabinets disestablished in 1891